A freedom fighter is a person engaged in a resistance movement against what they believe to be an oppressive and illegitimate government.

Freedom Fighter(s) may also refer to:

Media

Music
"Freedom Fighters", a song by P.O.D. from their album Payable on Death 
"Freedom Fighters", a song by Two Steps From Hell from their albums Legend and Invincible, and used as a remix on their album SkyWorld
"Freedom Fighters" (song), from The Music's 2004 album Welcome to the North
"Freedom Fighters" (Miyavi song), a 2005 single by Japanese musician Miyavi
"Freedom Fighter" a song by Rainbow on their 1981 album Difficult to Cure

Television
Freedom Fighter, Lee Hoe-young, a 2010 South Korean television series

Freedom Fighters: The Ray, a 2017 animated web series included in the Arrowverse

Video games
Freedom Fighters (video game), a video game developed by IO Interactive, released in 2003
Freedom Fighter (video game), a laserdisc arcade game released in 1984

Other media
Freedom Fighters (comics), a number of fictional superhero teams in comic books published by DC Comics, and two comics series featuring these teams
Freedom Fighters (role-playing game), a 1986 military game

Groups
The Freedom Fighters, a professional wrestling tag team later known as The Blade Runners
Cambodian Freedom Fighters, a political and paramilitary organization, active since 1989
Economic Freedom Fighters, a South African political party, active since 2013
Liberation Tigers of Tamil Eelam, a guerrilla organization, years active (1975-2009)
Mujahideen (in Arabic)
Mukti Bahini (in Bengali), a Bengali guerrilla resistance team, active in 1971
Uganda Freedom Fighters, a rebel group active in 1986
Ulster Freedom Fighters (UFF), a Ulster loyalist right-wing paramilitary group active from 1973 - 1998 during The Troubles in Northern Ireland

Other uses
Indian freedom fighters, activists in the Indian independence movement who receive a pension from the Indian Government
F-5 Freedom Fighter (or Tiger II), a low cost entry level supersonic fighter aircraft
Freedom Fighters and Rehabilitation Division, a division of the Ministry of Home Affairs, India
Paradise/Freedom Fighters, a football club based in Punta Gorda, Belize